The Fenestellaceae are a family of fungi with an uncertain taxonomic placement in the class Dothideomycetes.

Genera
As accepted by GBIF;
 Fenestella  - 40 spp.
 Lojkania  - 10 spp.
 Sydowina  - 2 spp.

References

External links
Index Fungorum

Pleosporales